Raymond Lee (January 3, 1910 – June 26, 1974) was an American child actor in films who became a film historian and author. His film career lasted from 1915 until 1927.

He was one of the children cast in Sidney Franklin's series Fox Sunshine Kiddies. Lee's film roles included a part in The Kid, a Charlie Chaplin film

He wrote about animal actors in 1970.

Selected filmography
 The Babes in the Woods (1917)
The Kid (1921)
No Woman Knows (1921)
Long Live the King (1923)
Bread (1924)
The Dramatic Life of Abraham Lincoln (1924)

Bibliography
Fit for the Chase; Cars and the Movies by Raymond Lee, 1969
The faces of Hollywood by Clarence Sinclair Bull and Raymond Lee, A. S. Barnes, 1969
Pearl White: the peerless fearless girl by Manuel Weltmann and Raymond Lee, A. S. Barnes, 1969
Gloria Swanson by Richard M. Hudson and Raymond Lee, A. S. Barnes, 1970 
DeMille: the man and his pictures y Gabe Essoe and Raymond Lee, A. S. Barnes, 1970
Not So Dumb; The Life and Times of Animal Actors by Raymond Lee, 1970
The Films of Mary Pickford (1971)
Gangsters and Hoodlums; The Underworld in Cinema by Raymond Lee and B. C. Van Hecke, 1971

References

External links

1910 births
1974 deaths
American male child actors
American film historians
20th-century American male actors
American male film actors
20th-century American historians
American male non-fiction writers
20th-century American male writers